Dobronín is a municipality and village in Jihlava District in the Vysočina Region of the Czech Republic. It has about 1,900 inhabitants.

History
The first written mention of Dobronín is from 1351. An unconfirmed mention is documented already in 1233. Today's municipality of Dobronín was established in 1948 by merger of villages of Dobronín and Německý Šicendorf.

In May 1945, after World War II, local Czechs massacred more than dozen local ethnic German civilians. Since 2009, police investigation continues in that case, as more human remains are unearthed in the village.

Twin towns – sister cities

Dobronín is twinned with:
 Bellmund, Switzerland

References

Villages in Jihlava District